The International Women's Forum (IWF), founded in 1974 as the Women's Forum of New York, is an invitation-only women's organization with some 7,000 members. Its mission is "to support the women leaders of today and tomorrow". The IWF hosts two conferences each year to address women's issues and it provides intensive leadership training programs for women. The Leadership Foundation, Inc., a supporting organization, provides a Fellows Program and the Women Athletes Business Network (WABN) Program.

Members
The IWF has been described as "highly influential." Notable members have included Hillary Clinton, Madeleine Albright, Sandra Day O'Connor, Coretta King, Betty Friedan, and Katharine Graham.

History
The group started as the Women's Forum of New York, founded in 1974 by Elinor Guggenheimer, Muriel Siebert, Eleanor Holmes Norton, and Muriel Fox. Over the next few years it expanded to Atlanta, Chicago, Colorado, Los Angeles, New York, San Francisco, and Washington, D.C. In 1982 it became international with the addition of the United Kingdom and was renamed the International Women's Forum in 1987. It is active in Europe, Asia, Latin America and the Middle East as well as the United States.

"Women Who Make a Difference"
The IWF maintains an International Hall of Fame and confers an annual "Women Who Make a Difference" award. Past awardees have included:

 2000: Italian politician Beatrice Rangoni Machiavelli
 2010: American judge Leigh Saufley
 2011: Singaporean urban planner and architect Dr. Cheong Koon Hean
 2012: Nyamko Sabuni, Swedish Minister for Gender Equality
 2014: Zanele Mbeki, founder of the Women's Development Banking Trust and former First Lady of South Africa
 2015: Sister Stanislaus Kennedy, founder of Focus Ireland
 2016: American lawyer Gloria Allred
 2016: Ilya Espino de Marotta, engineer who led the Panama Canal Expansion Project
 2017: American lawyer and academic Danielle Conway
 2018: American author and organizer Charlotte Bunch

References

External links
International Women's Forum
The Phenomenal Women Group

Organizations established in 1974
International women's organizations